Turkey took part in the Eurovision Song Contest 1980. The country was represented by Ajda Pekkan with the song "Pet'r Oil" written by Şanar Yurdatapan and composed by Attila Özdemiroğlu.

Before Eurovision

4. Eurovision Şarkı Yarışması Türkiye Finali 
The final took place on 24 February 1980 at the TRT Studios in Ankara, hosted by Bülend Özveren. All songs were performed by Ajda Pekkan and the winning song was determined by an expert jury in two rounds. In the first round, the lowest-scoring song was eliminated. In the second round, "Pet'r Oil" was selected as the winning song.

At Eurovision
On the night of the contest Pekkan performed second in the running order following Austria and preceding Greece. At the close of the voting the song received 23 points, placing 15th in a field of 19 countries. This result was seen by disappointment both by Pekkan and the Turkish audience.

The Turkish jury awarded its 12 points to the Netherlands.

Voting

References 

1980
Countries in the Eurovision Song Contest 1980
Eurovision